The fourth Annual American Music Awards were held on January 31, 1977.

Winners and nominees

1977